In the 2021 French Open – Boys' doubles, Flavio Cobolli and Dominic Stricker were the defending champions, but both players were no longer eligible to participate in junior events.

Arthur Fils and Giovanni Mpetshi Perricard won the title after defeating Martin Katz and German Samofalov 7–5, 6–2 in the final.

Seeds

Draw

Finals

Top half

Bottom half

External links 
Draw at rolandgarros.com
Draw at ITFtennis.com

References

Boys' Doubles
2021